Johnnie Edward Poe (born August 29, 1959) is a former professional American football cornerback who spent his 7-year NFL career with the New Orleans Saints. Poe played college football at the University of Missouri, before being drafted to the Saints in 1981.

Johnnie played a total of 100 games over his seven-year career, in which he amassed 17 interceptions, 73 yards from 9 punt returns, and 2 touchdowns.  1983 is arguably Johnnie's best year as he picked off 7 passes and ran back one interception for a touchdown.

References

1959 births
Living people
American football cornerbacks
New Orleans Saints players
Missouri Tigers football players
University of Missouri alumni
Players of American football from St. Louis